Wan Gyeop was one of the four members (No In, Han Eum, Sam and Wang Gyeop) who operated the government of Wiman Joseon. His position was a general. Since Wang Gyeop had a family name, it is believed that he was an exile from China or person related to China. Just like his master Ugeo who was the last king of Wiman Joseon. He was in charge of military affairs.

In BC 109 to 108, when Han dynasty attacked Wiman Joseon, he was surrendered instantly together with No In and Han Eum while leaving the King of Wiman Joseon Uego. After their surrender, he was nominated as a peerage of Ping Zhou (Hanja:平州) by Han dynasty, but died after one year without successor. Ping Zhou was abolished after his death.

See also
Han conquest of Gojoseon

References

Sources

註 042

Wiman Joseon people
Korean people of Chinese descent
Korean military personnel
Year of birth unknown
105 BC deaths